Rúben Tiago Rodrigues Ribeiro (born 1 August 1987) is a Portuguese professional footballer who plays as an attacking midfielder for Turkish club Hatayspor.

He achieved Primeira Liga totals of 166 games and 17 goals, for Leixões, Beira-Mar, Paços de Ferreira, Rio Ave, Gil Vicente, Boavista and Sporting CP, winning the Taça da Liga with the last of those clubs in 2018. He also played professionally in the United Arab Emirates and Turkey.

Club career

Early years
Born in Porto, Ribeiro spent most of his youth career with local Boavista F.C. before joining Leixões S.C. in 2002 to complete his development. He only managed to total 13 league appearances in his first three senior seasons, ten of which in 2008–09, spent in the Primeira Liga; his debut in the competition took place on 15 September 2007, when he came on as a late substitute in a 0–0 away draw against precisely Boavista.

Ribeiro played with F.C. Penafiel in the 2011–12 campaign, in the Segunda Liga. On 22 June 2012 he returned to the top flight, signing for four years with S.C. Beira-Mar.

Paços Ferreira
In the summer of 2013, after scoring a career-best six goals which was not enough to help prevent relegation, Ribeiro joined F.C. Paços de Ferreira of the same league on a three-year contract. He scored once during the first half of his first season, later labelling his spell there as "the worst" of his career, before spending the better part of the following months on loan to Rio Ave F.C. and Gil Vicente F.C. also in the top tier.

Boavista and Rio Ave
Ribeiro returned to Boavista on 7 January 2016, on a deal running until 30 June. He played his first league match 11 days later, when he featured the entire 4–0 home win over Vitória de Setúbal.

In the subsequent off-season, Ribeiro agreed a to a two-year contract at former club Rio Ave. In one of his first games on 4 August 2016 in the third qualifying round of the UEFA Europa League, he equalised in a 1–1 home draw with SK Slavia Prague, though the Czechs advanced on the away goals rule. He started 27 times in his debut campaign, helping the Luís Castro-led side to a seventh-place finish.

On 13 December 2017, Ribeiro was one of three players on target in the 3–2 home defeat of S.L. Benfica in the Taça de Portugal.

Sporting CP
Near the end of the calendar year, Ribeiro signed with Sporting CP who paid €400,000 to acquire his services on a two-and-a-half-year deal effective as of 11 January 2018. He was awarded the #7 jersey which had been previously worn by several players who failed to perform at the club, and made his debut on 14 January by starting and playing 66 minutes in a 3–0 victory against C.D. Aves at the Estádio José Alvalade. He started in the Taça da Liga final thirteen days later, being substituted at half time in the win over Vitória de Setúbal.

In the summer of 2018, Ribeiro was one of several players who unilaterally severed their contracts with Sporting, after an attack by fans on the training ground.

Later career
Ribeiro left his country's league for the first time in October 2018 when he joined Abu Dhabi-based Al Ain FC, with the deal being confirmed the following 30 January. He returned to Portugal late in the same year, agreeing to a short-team contract at former team Gil Vicente.

Ribeiro moved abroad again on 16 August 2020, joining Turkish Süper Lig side Hatayspor on a free transfer. In July 2022, the 35-year-old signed a two-year extension. He survived an earthquake the following February by jumping out his window.

Career statistics

Club

Honours
Leixões
Segunda Liga: 2006–07

Sporting CP
Taça da Liga: 2017–18

References

External links

1987 births
Living people
Portuguese footballers
Footballers from Porto
Association football midfielders
Primeira Liga players
Liga Portugal 2 players
Leixões S.C. players
F.C. Penafiel players
S.C. Beira-Mar players
F.C. Paços de Ferreira players
Rio Ave F.C. players
Gil Vicente F.C. players
Boavista F.C. players
Sporting CP footballers
UAE Pro League players
Al Ain FC players
Süper Lig players
Hatayspor footballers
Portuguese expatriate footballers
Expatriate footballers in the United Arab Emirates
Expatriate footballers in Turkey
Portuguese expatriate sportspeople in the United Arab Emirates
Portuguese expatriate sportspeople in Turkey